Zvonimir Krznarić (born June 4, 1972) is a Croatian sprint canoer who competed in the early 1990s. At the 1992 Summer Olympics in Barcelona, he was eliminated in the repechages of both the K-1 500 m and the K-1 1000 m events.

References
Sports-Reference.com profile

1972 births
Canoeists at the 1992 Summer Olympics
Croatian male canoeists
Living people
Olympic canoeists of Croatia